John Inglis Taylor (21 May 1949 – 16 November 2019) was a rugby union player who represented Australia.

Taylor, a wing, was born in Wollongong, New South Wales and claimed a total of 4 international rugby caps for Australia.

References

Australian rugby union players
Australia international rugby union players
1949 births
2019 deaths
Rugby union wings
Rugby union players from Wollongong